Civil death is the loss of all or almost all civil rights by a person due to a conviction for a felony or due to an act by the government of a country that results in the loss of civil rights. It is usually inflicted on persons convicted of crimes against the state or adults determined by a court to be legally incompetent because of mental disability.

Medieval Europe
In medieval Europe, felons lost all civil rights upon their conviction. This civil death often led to actual death, since anyone could kill and injure a felon with impunity. Under the Holy Roman Empire, a person declared civilly dead was referred to as vogelfrei ('free as a bird') and could even be killed since they were completely outside the law.

Historically outlawry, that is, declaring a person as an outlaw, was a common form of civil death.

United States
In the US, the disenfranchisement of felons has been called a form of civil death, as has being subjected to collateral consequences in general. The contention is not generally supported by legal scholars. Civil death as such remains part of the law in New York, Rhode Island and the Virgin Islands.

Deprivation of Political Rights (China, PRC)
The Deprivation of Political Rights is an accessory punishment defined in the Criminal Law of the People's Republic of China (PRC) (Article 34 of Chapter III), which can be enforced solely or with a principal penalty (e.g. capital punishment or life sentence) to limit the convicted person's right to be involved in political activities. For those sentenced to a principal penalty with deprivation of political rights, the deprivation is effective during their time incarcerated and the duration as sentenced from the day of their release or parole. It is only automatically imposed on those sentenced to life imprisonment or death penalty. If the principle penalty is commuted, usually so will the deprivation of political rights. Political rights are not automatically deprived for prisoners, and those inmates who are not subject to this deprivation can and do still vote and theoretically can even be elected. The PRC being a one party state, this penalty is not a significant one.

Political rights
As defined in the Criminal Law, the nominal political rights include:
the right to vote and to stand for election;
the rights of freedom of speech, of the press, of assembly, of association, of procession and of demonstration;
the right to hold a position in a state organization; and
the right to hold a leading position in any state-owned company, enterprise, institution or people's organization.

See also
Loss of rights due to felony conviction
Sex offender registries in the United States
Social death
Ghosts… of the Civil Dead

Notes and references

External links 
 

Punishments
Human rights